Huberantha palawanensis (synonym Polyalthia palawanensis) is a species of plant in the Annonaceae family. It is endemic to the Philippines.

References

Flora of the Philippines
Vulnerable plants
Flora of Palawan
Taxonomy articles created by Polbot
palawanensis